Sikandarpur is a village in Jagatpur block of Rae Bareli district, Uttar Pradesh, India. As of 2011, it has a population of 494 people, in 86 households. It has no schools and no healthcare facilities.

The 1961 census recorded Sikandarpur as comprising one hamlet, with a total population of 135 people (67 male and 68 female), in 32 households and 32 physical houses. The area of the village was given as 153 acres.

The main staple foods were listed as wheat and rice.

References

Villages in Raebareli district